Robin Lehman (born Robert Owen Lehman Jr.; December 3, 1936) is an American documentary filmmaker best known for his short films Don't (1974) and The End of the Game (1975), which received consecutive Academy Awards for Best Documentary (Short Subject). He is a member of the Lehman family.

Biography 
Born Robert Owen Lehman Jr., he is the son of Robert Lehman (1891–1969) and Ruth "Kitty" (Leavitt) Meeker Lehman (1904–1984). His mother is the daughter of William Homer Leavitt and Ruth Bryan Owen and granddaughter of United States Secretary of State, William Jennings Bryan. His father is the son of Philip Lehman and the grandson of Emanuel Lehman. Her father is of Jewish background.

Outside of his work directing short documentaries, Lehman contributed special material to Tommy, the 1975 film version of The Who's rock opera. In 1977, he served as co-cinematographer of The Black Pearl.

He is married to music theorist Marie Rolf, a professor and senior associate dean at the Eastman School of Music. They have two children, Rolf and Morgan. He was previously married to Aki Lehman with whom he has two children, Philip and Kate.

Filmography 
1972 Flyaway
1973 Colter's Hell
1974 Sea Creatures
1974 Don't
1975 See
1975 The End of the Game
1976 Nightlife
1978 Manimals
1981 Forever Young
1981 The Little Players (about the eponymous puppet troupe)

References

External links
 

1936 births
Lehman family
American people of English descent
American people of German-Jewish descent
Living people
American documentary filmmakers